Gnatstown is an unincorporated community in York County, Pennsylvania, United States.

References

Populated places in York County, Pennsylvania